David E. Carter is an entrepreneur and writer on graphic design, logo design, and corporate branding. He has written many trademark and logo books and won a number of regional Emmys for his local television productions. Since moving to Sanibel Island, Carter has teamed with Pfeifer Realty Group owner Eric Pfeifer to make several historical documentaries about Sanibel Island including "Sanibel Before the Causeway" and "Postcards and Pictures from Sanibel".

References

Advertising theorists
Living people
Year of birth missing (living people)
Businesspeople from Florida